Chancelor Johnathan Bennett (born April 16, 1993), known professionally as Chance the Rapper, is an American rapper, singer-songwriter, and record producer. Born and raised in Chicago, Bennett released his debut mixtape 10 Day in 2012. He began to gain mainstream recognition in 2013 after releasing his second mixtape, Acid Rap. He then released his third mixtape, Coloring Book in 2016, which garnered further critical acclaim and attention. It earned him three Grammy Awards, including the award for Best Rap Album; upon winning, it became the first streaming-only album to win a Grammy Award, and peaked at number eight on the Billboard 200. His debut studio album The Big Day was released in 2019.

Aside from his solo career, Bennett is a member of the Chicago collective Savemoney, and is the vocalist for the band the Social Experiment; they released the album Surf in 2015, led by trumpeter Nico Segal. He is also involved in social activism in the Chicago community where he resides.

Early life 
Chancelor Bennett was born in Chicago, Illinois. His father, Ken Williams-Bennett, was an aide to the late Chicago mayor Harold Washington and then-Senator Barack Obama. His mother, Lisa Bennett, worked for the Illinois Attorney General. Bennett grew up in the middle-class neighborhood of West Chatham on Chicago's South Side. When Bennett was sixteen, his father began to work in the Department of Labor during President Barack Obama's first term. Bennett personally met President Obama in his youth and discussed his aspirations to be a rapper, to which Obama responded with "word". Bennett was originally going to move to Washington, D.C., following Obama's win in the 2008 presidential election, though those plans eventually fell through. Bennett attended Jones College Prep High School where he was a member of the Jewish Student Union.

Bennett's interest in music began with Michael Jackson, who he exclusively listened to on cassettes until the fifth grade. Growing up, Bennett's parents were constantly playing music, including Billie Holiday, Sam Cooke and other artists in the jazz and gospel genres. Bennett began listening to hip-hop after hearing "Through the Wire" by Kanye West on the radio while walking through Hyde Park, Chicago. After finding out the song was on West's debut album The College Dropout, Bennett purchased the album, making it the first hip-hop album that Bennett listened to. Bennett considers West a huge influence on him and has said that he was inspired to begin rapping by West. Bennett and West met each other in August 2014 at Bonnaroo Music Festival.

Bennett began rapping in the sixth grade when his cousin let him start using his studio. In his freshman year at Jones College Prep High School, Bennett formed the hip-hop duo Instrumentality alongside a friend. Many of Chance's earliest performances took place at the YOUmedia Lyricist Loft at Harold Washington Library in Chicago. After placing second in a local songwriting contest, Bennett met then-Chicago Mayor, Richard M. Daley who enjoyed his music. Bennett spent most of his junior year and a small amount of his senior year writing a draft for his debut project, 10 Day, which was later released after Bennett was suspended for ten days after being caught smoking cannabis.

Music career

2011–2012: Career beginnings and 10 Day 

At Jones College Prep High School, some of his teachers ridiculed his aspirations to become a musician. In 2011 during his school year, following a 10-day suspension for marijuana possession on campus, Bennett recorded his first full-length project in a span of 8 months, a mixtape entitled 10 Day (also known as #10Day). In December 2011, he released a song titled "Windows", and publicly announced his 10 Day project. In February 2012, Bennett was highlighted as one of Complex magazine's "10 New Chicago Rappers to Watch Out For". Bennett says he spent "about eight months recording, writing, and making connections off of the hunger to put out something". Bennett released the mixtape on April 3, 2012, and it has since been downloaded over 500,000 times via mixtape-sharing site DatPiff. The mixtape was well-received locally and helped Bennett make connections with producers such as Chuck Inglish, Kenny Jame$ and Blended Babies. The mixtape also grabbed the attention of Forbes magazine, which featured it in the publication's Cheap Tunes column.

2012–2015: Acid Rap and The Social Experiment 

In July 2012, Bennett appeared on American rapper Childish Gambino's sixth mixtape, Royalty, on the track "They Don't Like Me". Gambino would go on to ask Bennett to join on his first concert tour of North America as his opening act.

On April 30, 2013, Bennett released his second mixtape, Acid Rap, on DatPiff. The record has been downloaded over 1.5 million times. Bennett enlisted guest appearances from Twista, Vic Mensa, Saba, BJ the Chicago Kid, Action Bronson, Childish Gambino and Ab-Soul. Acid Rap was well received by critics. At Metacritic, the mixtape received an average score of 86, based on 21 critics, which indicates "universal acclaim". It was nominated for Best Mixtape at the 2013 BET Hip Hop Awards. On May 6, 2013, the song "Paranoia" (produced by Nosaj Thing), after initially being featured as a hidden track on Acid Rap, was released as a contribution to Yours Truly and Adidas originals' "Songs from Scratch" series.

In June 2013, Bennett was featured in a commercial for MySpace as part of their relaunch, alongside fellow American rappers Mac Miller, Pharrell Williams and Schoolboy Q, among others. In July 2013, Acid Rap debuted at number 63 on the Billboard Top R&B/Hip-Hop Albums chart, due to downloads on iTunes and Amazon. In August 2013, Bennett performed at the Chicago music festival Lollapalooza. Acid Rap was listed on multiple 50 best albums of 2013 lists, including 26th for Rolling Stone, 12th on Pitchfork's list, and ranked 4th by Complex. It was also listed as one of NPR Music's 50 Favorite Albums of 2013. Bennett began his Social Experiment Tour in Champaign, Illinois, on October 25, 2013, lasting until December 19, 2013.

In March 2014, Bennett appeared in a shoppable online video for Dockers, promoting the brand's spring line, in which Bennett talks his style, love for creating music, and how it feels to live in Los Angeles. On May 5, 2014, XXL revealed Bennett was included in their annual freshman class, alongside fellow up-and-comers Isaiah Rashad, Ty Dolla $ign, Rich Homie Quan, Vic Mensa, August Alsina, Troy Ave, Kevin Gates, Lil Bibby, Jon Connor, Lil Durk and Jarren Benton. During Fall 2014, Bennett and other artists participated in Verge Campus tour. In November 2014, Bennett was presented Chicago's "Outstanding Youth of the Year Award" by Mayor Rahm Emanuel.

In January 2015, Bennett was listed number 7 on the "Forbes 30 Under 30" 2015 music list. In March 2015, Bennett released a short film called Mr. Happy, which was directed by Colin Tilley. Mr. Happy centers around the main character, named Victor, who is struggling from depression and was attempting to commit suicide. After many failed attempts to kill himself, he discovers Mr. Happy. Along with boxer Mike Tyson, Bennett worked with Madonna to write and feature on the track "Iconic" released that same month. On April 30, 2015, Bennett gave a lecture at Harvard University's Hiphop Archive & Research Institute. Just before midnight on May 28, 2015, Surf was released for free on the American iTunes store as an iTunes Exclusive. The album received high acclaim from music critics, receiving an aggregate score of 86 on review site Metacritic, which indicates "universal acclaim", based on 17 reviews. In June 2015, Bennett performed at the Bonnaroo Music Festival in the super jam concert collection. He also made a guest performance with fellow rapper Kendrick Lamar, on stage with Earth, Wind & Fire. On July 19, 2015, Bennett and Lil B announced that they recorded a collaborative mixtape. The two rappers released it on August 5, titled Free (Based Freestyles Mixtape).

On October 13, 2015, Bennett released a video for a new song, titled "Family Matters", on his website. The song, which shares the same name as his fall 2015 tour with D.R.A.M., Metro Boomin, Towkio (and Hiatus Kaiyote on select dates), is a rework of the Kanye West song "Family Business" from his 2004 album The College Dropout. A few days before this, a video surfaced online of Bennett performing a new song live, ending the song by saying the words "third mixtape", leading many to believe the wait might be coming to a close for his next release. On October 27, 2015, Bennett premiered a new song, titled "Angels" featuring Saba, on The Late Show with Stephen Colbert. On December 12, 2015, Bennett performed on Saturday Night Live, on a new song, titled "Somewhere in Paradise", which featured Jeremih and fellow Chicago artist R. Kelly. The song was later pulled from circulation in wake of the airing of the television documentary, Surviving R. Kelly in 2019, which exposed new allegations of sexual misconduct and sexual assault by Kelly. Bennett expressed his regret of working with Kelly, and apologised with a statement on Twitter.

2016–present: Coloring Book, The Big Day and The Voice

In 2016, Bennett was a prominent figure on Kanye West's album The Life of Pablo, co-writing and appearing on several tracks, including "Ultralight Beam", "Father Stretch My Hands Pt. 1", "Famous", "Feedback", and "Waves". According to West, the album's release was delayed due to Bennett's desire for "Waves" to make the album's final cut. Bennett was also featured on a track titled "Need To Know" on Macklemore & Ryan Lewis's album This Unruly Mess I've Made. The following March, Bennett was featured on Skrillex's remix of Hundred Waters' "Show Me Love". On April 16, 2016, Chance and other musicians, including Alicia Keys, Busta Rhymes, Janelle Monáe, and J. Cole, met with President Obama at the White House to discuss the My Brother's Keeper Challenge initiative.

On May 12, 2016, Chance's third mixtape, Coloring Book (promoted as Chance 3), was released, streaming exclusively on Apple Music. In the first week, the mixtape was streamed over 57.3 million times, which was equivalent to 38,000 units sold, debuting at number eight on the US Billboard 200 chart. It became the first release to chart solely on streams. The mixtape was met with widespread acclaim from music critics, and on review aggregator site Metacritic, received an average score of 89, based on 21 critics, which indicates "universal acclaim". On July 13, at the 2016 ESPY Awards show, along with Kareem Abdul-Jabbar, he performed a tribute song titled "I Was A Rock" for the late Muhammad Ali. On August 16, 2016, Chance wrote the single "We the People" paired in a Nike commercial titled "Unlimited Together", a film directed by Hiro Murai. A second commercial was released on October 4, by Nestlé, to promote the Kit Kat bar, with Chance starring in costume remixing their jingle. On September 15, 2016, Chance began his Magnificent Coloring World Tour in San Diego.

Bennett announced the Magnificent Coloring Tour with an event called Magnificent Coloring Day Festival at Chicago's Guaranteed Rate Field, with a line up including Lil Wayne, Young Thug, Skrillex, Tyler, the Creator and Lil Uzi Vert, taking place on September 24, 2016, being the first-ever music festival at U.S. Cellular Field. This one day festival event also featured a surprise appearance by Kanye West. Bennett launched a campaign in conjunction with rapperradio.com to get his music on the radio on August 17, 2016.

In September 2016, H&M solicited Bennett to headline their new campaign. In November 2016, he continued on the Magnificent Coloring World Tour, but cancelled the rest of his shows on the European leg due to personal reasons. In November 2016, Bennett announced during an interview with DJ Semtex that he was working on his debut album. Bennett was offered a chance to sign with Kanye West's GOOD Music in December 2016, though he refused due to his popularity as an independent artist and the freedom of not being attached to a label. In an August interview about his debut album, Bennett said he may sell the album, a departure from his previous projects' free distribution format. After a report was leaked claiming that audio distribution platform SoundCloud was close to bankruptcy and had laid off most of its workers, Bennett had a phone call with SoundCloud CEO Alex Ljung. Following the phone call, Bennett went onto Twitter, posting that SoundCloud is "here to stay". It was later reported that Bennett was just reflecting on what Ljung had previously published in a press release following the leak. Soon after, Bennett released a SoundCloud exclusive track with Young Thug called "Big B's" to benefit the platform, a surprise move that was planned in response to the SoundCloud bankruptcy leak.

In February 2017, Bennett performed at the 59th annual Grammy Awards, receiving 7 nominations and winning 3 Grammys. His performance featured Kirk Franklin and Tamela Mann, along with a gospel choir and orchestra conducted by Tom Brooks. On July 13, Bennett performed a NPR Tiny Desk Concert where he recited an original poem. The poem, entitled "The Other Side", was crafted on his ride from his hotel, in Washington D.C., to the NPR music offices and was written with black marker on typing paper. Chance also performed, "Juke Jam", a song off of his album Coloring Book, and a cover to Stevie Wonder's song "They Won't Go When I Go" released in 1974.

In July 2017, Bennett was nominated for an Emmy Award for his song "Last Christmas" that was performed on Saturday Night Live. He shares the nomination with Kenan Thompson, Eli Brueggemann, and Will Stephen in the category for Outstanding Original Music and Lyrics. In August 2017, Bennett headlined day three of Lollapalooza at Grant Park in his hometown of Chicago. His performance drew record crowds with some estimates making it the largest attended performance in the event's history. In November 2017, Bennett curated and headlined the Obama Foundation community event at the Wintrust Arena in Chicago. The event capstoned the inaugural Obama Summit event which featured special guests including former President Barack Obama, First Lady Michelle Obama, Andra Day, Gloria Estefan, Aziz Ansari, Lena Waithe, Lin-Manuel Miranda, and more.

In 2018, he featured on "Logout", a song from Saba's album Care for Me and "Best Life" from Cardi B's debut album Invasion of Privacy, and released 4 new songs in July. Bennett performed at Mac Miller: A Celebration of Life on October 31, 2018, a tribute concert in honor of the recently passed Mac Miller. On November 29, 2018, Bennett released 2 new songs, "My Own Thing" and "The Man Who Has Everything", and announced on February 11, 2019, that his debut album would be released sometime in July of that same year. During Super Bowl LII Bennett appeared alongside The Backstreet Boys in a commercial for Doritos with the two artist performing a remix of "I Want it That Way"  In May of that year Bennett was featured in Ed Sheeran's song "Cross Me"  On July 26, 2019, Bennett released his debut studio album The Big Day.

In 2019, he wrote the song "True Kinda Love" for Steven Universe: The Movie alongside Rebecca Sugar, James Fauntleroy, Macie Stewart, and Julian Sanchez, with vocals being performed by Estelle and Zach Callison. In December 2019, Bennett canceled his "The Big World Tour" for the second time to spend time with his newborn daughter.

In January 2020, it was announced that Bennett will be the host of the reboot of Punk'd that will air on the streaming service Quibi.

In February 2020, Nickelodeon announced Bennett would be the host of the 2020 Kids' Choice Awards on March 22. The entire show was later scrapped and replaced with a virtual ceremony hosted by Victoria Justice from her home, delayed to May 2 due to the COVID-19 pandemic, and with a lack of live musical performances overall due to the circumstances.

On October 11, 2022, it was announced that Bennett would be a coach on the twenty-third season of The Voice in spring 2023.

Artistry

Musical style 
Bennett has stated in interviews with XXL and Complex that Kanye West, James Brown, MC Hammer, Prince, Lupe Fiasco, Common, Young Thug, Lil Wayne, Esham, Eminem, Souls of Mischief and Freestyle Fellowship have influenced him. When asked about the gospel influences in his music, he also has stated that Kirk Franklin is one of his favorite artists, and his favorite composer.

Bennett's music has been described as versatile and uplifting. His music generally contains jazz-inspired melodies and gospel influences. Bennett's lyrics usually have references to Christian theology, his struggles with his faith and his upbringing. Chance incorporates choirs into his music to attempt to maximize the gospel undertones. Sharde' Chapman at HuffPost has described Bennett's lyrics as "creative" and "colorful".

Bennett often does traditional singing songs, and possesses a light-lyric tenor voice with an expansive vocal range that spans three octaves. Bennett's vocal range reaches its extreme low at the bass F♯ (F♯2), and rises to its peak high at the tenor high F (F5).

Fashion 
Bennett's fashion style is a large part of his public image, and he has taken interest in the industry. Bennett has designed hats for the Chicago White Sox. The Hollywood Reporter has said that Bennett is "redefining fashion" with his style of generally wearing overalls and contesting traditional hip-hop fashion norms. Bennett wore a suit that was meant to imitate Michael Jackson at the 2017 BET Awards. Bennett was seen wearing Thom Browne clothing at the 2017 Grammys. Bennett has been known to wear a signature hat with the number three on it. "I've rationalized it to myself that it stands for the third mixtape, the Holy Trinity, and the three-pronged family of myself, my daughter, and my girl," Bennett said in an interview in regards to the meaning of the number three.

Activism and politics 
Bennett's father, Ken Bennett, has been involved in Democratic Party politics on the local and national level. Ken Bennett worked for Barack Obama as a presidential appointee and as an aide. Ken Bennett also worked on Obama's presidential campaign in 2008, and has worked as an aide to Mayor of Chicago Rahm Emanuel and as 2019 Chicago mayoral campaign co-chair for Toni Preckwinkle. Despite his family's ties to the Democratic Party, Bennett has called himself an independent voter, though he has a history of supporting Democrats. Bennett volunteered with Barack Obama's reelection campaign by phonebanking in Hyde Park, Chicago and has given speeches at the University of Chicago Institute of Politics.

In November 2014, Emanuel named Bennett as Chicago's Outstanding Youth of the Year for his activism. Bennett's work to support Chicago youth includes hosting Open Mike nights for Chicago-area high school students in collaboration with Chicago Public Library, which drew the attendance of fellow Chicago natives and celebrities like Hannibal Buress and Kanye West. In December 2015, Bennett joined with Detroit-based nonprofit group Empowerment Plan to start an initiative called Warmest Winter 2016. The initiative raised money to give 1,000 specially manufactured coats, which doubled as sleeping bags and shoulder bags, and were manufactured by homeless citizens of Detroit, to homeless citizens of Chicago. In June 2016, he hosted the Teens in the Park event, a free youth festival on Chicago's Northerly Island that drew an attendance of 3,300.

Bennett co-created a new nonprofit called SocialWorks in September 2016, an extension of his Open Mike program which aimed to create youth programs for residents of Chicago, among other goals. Open Mike nights and the Warmest Winter initiative later became part of SocialWorks.

Bennett has actively fought to combat gun violence in his hometown of Chicago and in 2014, along with his father, promoted the "#SaveChicago" campaign. The campaign sought to stop gun violence over Memorial Day Weekend. During 2014's Memorial Day weekend, Chicago went 42 straight hours without a shooting. Bennett met with President Obama at the White House on April 16, 2016, to discuss My Brother's Keeper Challenge, an initiative of the United States Federal Government to promote intervention by civic leaders in the lives of young men of color to address their unique challenges and to promote racial justice, with other musicians, including Alicia Keys, Busta Rhymes, Janelle Monáe, J. Cole, and others. Bennett started a Twitter campaign for May 23, 2016, using #May23 to stop gun violence for 42 hours.

On March 6, 2017, after a meeting with Governor Bruce Rauner that did not go well only days before, Bennett announced his intention to donate $1,000,000 to Chicago Public Schools in order to help offset the lack of government funding provided. Following this, a movement arose to try and inspire Bennett to run for mayor of Chicago. This was backed by fellow media personalities including musician Drake.

Bennett is an outspoken critic of President Donald Trump, having criticized him numerous times and drawn comparisons to former President Barack Obama. During the 2016 Presidential election, Bennett said he was not scared of a Trump presidency. When asked why by GQ, Bennett said "You gotta just understand, like, shit has been fucked-up, right? Like, 'Make America Great Again', that's not a real thing because shit ain't really switched up for [white middle class]". Bennett endorsed Democratic candidate Hillary Clinton on October 6, 2016, expressing concerns about the way she was treated in the media and also expressing that she could "fix Chicago" and led a "march" to numerous polling stations with thousands of Chicagoans. Following the victory of Donald Trump in the 2016 presidential election, Bennett said "Trump was going to win, anybody in the world who's surprised by the election of Donald Trump has been ignorant of racism, and the tides and patterns of American history and world history." In February 2017, Bennett posted publicly on Twitter that he was worried President Trump was going to change constitutional term limits. Bennett has compared Trump's fascination with Chicago to "going to war". In August 2017, Bennett claimed to have a "bigger voice than Donald Trump". Bennett also became an outspoken critic of Chicago Mayor Emanuel later in his term, though his father had worked for Emanuel and he himself had earlier accepted Emanuel's support.

Bennett has been an active Twitter user, with several of his tweets on social issues going viral. For example, Bennett garnered attention from Time magazine when he tweeted criticism of an article titled "In Wake of Weinstein, Men Wonder If Hugging Women Still OK". Following Kanye West's Tweets announcing his support of Donald Trump in April 2018, Bennett tweeted in support of West's freedom to choose to be Republican, sparking controversy among his fanbase. Trump later tweeted thanking Bennett for his support of West, though Bennett disavowed Trump's praise.

In July 2018, Bennett purchased the Chicago journalism website Chicagoist from WNYC. The website had been inactive since it was abruptly shut down by former owner Joe Ricketts in November 2017, and Bennett planned to relaunch the website later in 2018. Chicagoist did not relaunch in 2018, and it is currently planning a 2019 reopening, according to its website.

In the 2019 Chicago mayoral election, Bennett was an active supporter of Amara Enyia. Bennett initially endorsed Enyia at a press conference in October 2018. Bennett campaigned with Enyia and made major donations to her mayoral bid. Fellow rapper and Chicago native Kanye West also donated to Enyia's campaign. In the February 2019 election, Enyia finished fifth out of fourteen candidates, and did not advance to the mayoral runoff. Lori Lightfoot and Preckwinkle, who had hired Chance's father as campaign co-chair, instead advanced to the runoff. In the runoff, Bennett endorsed Preckwinkle, criticizing Lightfoot as having worked against the interests of Chicago's black community.

In 2020, Bennett will be honored by UNICEF at their annual gala in Chicago with the UNICEF Chicago Humanitarian Award.

In 2020, Bennett endorsed Kanye West for president in West's 2020 presidential campaign. Bennett took to Twitter to praise West, stating he trusted in him more than he trusted Joe Biden. His Tweets were criticized heavily, but Bennett reiterated that he did not take them back.

Personal life 
Bennett lives in his hometown Chicago. He once shared a house in North Hollywood with James Blake. Describing his time in North Hollywood, Bennett called it "ungodly". After graduating from high school, Bennett attended a community college for a week before dropping out. Bennett has taken numerous recreational drugs during his lifetime, including LSD and Xanax, but has since stepped away from them.

Family 
His younger brother, Taylor Bennett, is also a rapper. Both brothers began rapping at the same time and have a similar style. Both the rappers also draw inspiration from fellow Chicago native Kanye West.

In July 2015, Bennett announced that he was expecting his first child with his girlfriend Kirsten Corley, whom he began to date in 2013. In September 2015, Corley gave birth to their daughter, Kensli. Kensli was kept out of social media until December 31, 2016, when Bennett posted a picture of her on Instagram. In May 2016, after they had stopped living together, Corley wanted the courts to declare Bennett as the father of their daughter, requiring him to pay child support.

In February 2017, Bennett's child support case reopened in an attempt to work out child support terms and a parenting schedule as Bennett and Corley moved to separate residences. The Chicago Sun-Times published an article about a dispute between the two in March 2017. Bennett replied to the article saying "Y'all better do y'all jobs and stop worrying about how good my family is. Just a friendly reminder. Don't let anybody get between you and your family." On March 21, 2017, the dispute was settled out of court. Corley and Bennett reconciled, and on July 4, 2018, they became engaged after 5 years together. The two married on March 9, 2019, at the Pelican Hill Resort in Newport Beach, California with guests including Kim Kardashian and Kanye West.

Bennett spends much of his free time with his daughter, and frequently takes her on outings. These have included a Chicago Bulls basketball game, meeting the Obamas and working out.

In September 2019, Chance's wife Kirsten announced they had their second daughter named Marli.

Christianity 
Bennett is a Christian and refers to Jesus Christ in many of his songs. Bennett was raised as a Christian by his grandmother but later fell out of the faith. He rediscovered his faith when his daughter was born with atrial flutter. Speaking about the situation, Bennett said "[I just] pray a whole lot, you know, and need a lot of angels and just see shit in a very, like, direct way. And…you know, God bless everything, it worked out well." Bennett wrote on Twitter following the situation on January 31, 2016, "Today's the last day my old life, last day smoking cigs. Headed to church for help. All things are possible through Christ who strengthens me."

Bennett has labelled himself as a Christian rapper following the release of his mixtape Coloring Book. Bennett believes that God is to thank for his blessings and his success. He has attended multiple dates for Kanye West's Sunday Service, most notably performing his verse on "Ultralight Beam" at Coachella 2019 and in his hometown at Chicago's Huntington Bank Pavilion.

Visit to Ghana 
On January 5, 2021, Chancelor visited Ghana to meet Vic Mensa. He claimed his Ghanaian name is 'Nana Kofi Boa-Ampensom' because he identifies himself as a Ghanaian. He met artistes in Ghana including Sarkodie, King Promise, Darkovibes and M.anifest. He also visited the Jubilee House with Vic Mensa where they met Ghanaian president Nana Akufo-Addo. He revealed on Twitter that he hopes to come back to Ghana in July 2022. He arrived in Ghana after he made a promise in 2019.

Discography 

 The Big Day (2019)
 Star Line Gallery (TBA)

Filmography

Concert tours 
 Magnificent Coloring World Tour (2016)
 Be Encouraged Tour (2017)
 The Big Tour (2019)

Awards and nominations

References

External links 

 
 

 
1993 births
Living people
American male film actors
American male television actors
American male voice actors
African-American Christians
African-American male rappers
African-American male singer-songwriters
Alternative hip hop musicians
American hip hop singers
American performers of Christian hip hop music
Grammy Award winners for rap music
Hip hop activists
Indie rappers
Rappers from Chicago
Illinois Democrats
21st-century American rappers
21st-century African-American male singers
Singer-songwriters from Illinois
Midwest hip hop musicians